Lake Nooney is located in Glacier National Park, in the U. S. state of Montana. The Herbst Glacier is located above the lake to the northwest. Rock flour (silt) from melting glaciers make the lake appear opaque turquoise in color.

See also
List of lakes in Glacier County, Montana

References

Nooney
Nooney